Céu Azul is a municipality in the state of Paraná in the Southern Region of Brazil.

The western region of Paraná was the target of logging companies in the 1950s. The company Pinho e Terras Ltda. installed a colony in the area in 1952 and brought workers, mainly from the state of Rio Grande do Sul. The first residents were primarily of German and Italian origin.

See also
List of municipalities in Paraná

References

Municipalities in Paraná